The Kyiv Oblast Council is the regional oblast council (parliament) of the Kyiv Oblast (province) located in central Ukraine.

Council members are elected for five year terms. In order to gain representation in the council, a party must gain more than 5 percent of the total vote.

Recent elections

2020
Distribution of seats after the 2020 Ukrainian local elections

Election date was 25 October 2020

2015
Distribution of seats after the 2015 Ukrainian local elections

Election date was 25 October 2015

References

 

Council
Regional legislatures of Ukraine
Unicameral legislatures